John Alan Gardiner Barrett (1929–1996) was Dean of Clonmacnoise from 1989 until 1996.

Barrett was educated at Trinity College, Dublin.  He was ordained in 1959. After a curacy at Bray he held incumbencies at Enniskeen, Navan, and Rathdrum  before his time as Dean.

References

1929 births
1996 deaths
Alumni of Trinity College Dublin
Deans of Clonmacnoise
20th-century Irish Anglican priests